Pu Bo (born November 1963) is a former Chinese politician who served as Vice Governor of Guizhou. He was dismissed from his position in May 2018 and placed under investigation by the Central Commission for Discipline Inspection and the National Supervisory Commission.

Career
Pu Bo was born in November 1963, and he was entered to Sichuan Forestry School (now Sichuan Agricultural University) in 1978. After he graduated from Sichuan Forestry School, he became an officer of Forestry Research Institute and Agricultural Trading Office in Nanchong Prefecture. In September 1987, he was accepted to Nanchong Normal College, where he majored in Chinese. After college, he worked in the Agricultural Commission. Later, he worked in the governments of Guang'an Prefecture and Wusheng County. 

In 1999, Pu was appointed as the Deputy Mayor of Guang'an, then he promoted to the Director of Propaganda Department in 2003.

In 2006, Pu was moved to Liangshan Yi Autonomous Prefecture, and appointed as the Vice Governor, then he was appointed as the Deputy Party Secretary and Mayor of Bazhong in 2008.

In 2010, he was appointed as the Deputy Director of the Organization Department of the CCP Sichuan Committee. In 2015, he was appointed as the Party Secretary of Deyang. During his tenure, he invited Arnold Schwarzenegger to serve as Global Publicity Ambassador of the Sanxingdui culture.

On January 22, 2018, he was transferred to Guiyang, capital of Guizhou province, he was elevated to vice-governor of Guizhou, with responsibility for environmental protection, land and resources, housing and town and country construction, industry and commerce, and quality and technical supervision.

Downfall
On May 4, 2018, four months after being named vice-governor, Pu Bo was placed under investigation by the Central Commission for Discipline Inspection, the party's internal disciplinary body, and the National Supervisory Commission, the highest anti-corruption agency of the People's Republic of China, for "serious violations of regulations and laws". He was expelled from the Communist Party on and removed from his post November 2. On November 28, he was arrested for suspected bribe taking.

On March 21, 2019, he stood trial at the Nanjing Intermediate Peoples Court on charges of taking bribes. Prosecutors accused Pu of taking advantage of his different positions in Sichuan between 1999 and 2017 to seek profits for various companies and individuals in corporate restructuring, construction project contracting, project development and personal promotions. In return, he received money and property worth over 71.26 million yuan ($10.6 million) either personally or through others. On July 18, Pu was sentenced to life in prison for taking bribes worth 71.26 million yuan ($10.6 million) by the Nanjing Intermediate People's Court.

References

1963 births
Sichuan Agricultural University alumni
Central Party School of the Chinese Communist Party alumni
Chinese Communist Party politicians from Sichuan
People's Republic of China politicians from Sichuan
Political office-holders in Sichuan
Political office-holders in Guizhou
Living people
Politicians from Nanchong
Expelled members of the Chinese Communist Party